William Sherwood Fox (1878-1967) was a Canadian classical scholar.

Notable positions in his academic career include assistant professor at Princeton University (1911–17), professor of classics at Western University of London, Ontario (1917–27), becoming dean of the faculty of arts there (1919–27), and president (1927-47).

References

Biographies

External links
 

1878 births
1967 deaths
Canadian academic administrators
Canadian classical scholars
Princeton University faculty
Academic staff of the University of Western Ontario
Canadian expatriates in the United States